Lake Mamacocha (Quechua mama mother / madam, qucha lake, mama qucha ocean, Mama Qucha) is a lake in Peru located in Cajamarca Region, Celendín Province, Huasmin District.

References 

Lakes of Peru
Lakes of Cajamarca Region